Inger Støjberg, between 2015 and 2019 the Danish Minister for Immigration and Integration, was impeached by the Folketing on 2 February 2021 with 141 votes for and 30 against. Støjberg was accused of, in her capacity as Minister, having instructed the Danish Immigration Service to separate asylum-seeking partners where one partner was under the age of 18, which – according to the ombudsman of the Folketing, an examination by a commission, and an assessment by two impartial lawyers – was not allowed. It was deemed against the European Convention on Human Rights, and there will be an individual evaluation of each couple's separation.

The impeachment's 141 votes came from The Red–Green Alliance, The Socialist People's Party, The Social Democratic Party, The Social Liberal Party, Liberal Alliance, The Conservative People's Party and The Alternative, as well as a majority of members from Venstre. On the other side, The New Right, The Danish People's Party and nine members of Venstre, including former Prime Minister Lars Løkke Rasmussen, voted against it, the latter saying it could make her a political martyr.

Støjberg was tried before the Court of Impeachment, which consists of 30 members: 15 Supreme Court judges and 15 members chosen by the Folketing.

On 13 December 2021, Støjberg was convicted and sentenced to 60 days of unconditional imprisonment, when 25 out of 26 judges considered her guilty.

References

February 2021 events in Denmark
Trials in Denmark
Impeachment

Political scandals in Denmark